Ride a White Horse: Live in London E.P. is the second extended play (EP) by English electronic music duo Goldfrapp. It was released digitally on 13 February 2006 by Mute Records.

Track listing

References

2006 EPs
2006 live albums
Goldfrapp albums
Live EPs
Mute Records EPs
Mute Records live albums